Jayavīra Banḍāra was King of Kandy from 1511 to 1551. He succeeded his father Senasammata Vikramabahu as king and was succeeded by his son Karalliyadde Bandara. During the reign of Banḍāra Catholic friars appeared at court and some conversions took place in the kingdom.

See also
 List of Sri Lankan monarchs

References

Citations

Bibliography

External links
 Kings & Rulers of Sri Lanka
 Codrington's Short History of Ceylon

House of Siri Sanga Bo
1551 deaths